Haloze is a geographical sub-region of Slovenia. It is in the northeast of the country, in the Styria region.

General characteristics
Haloze is a hilly area, running roughly east–west bounded by the border with Croatia to the south and the Dravinja and Drava rivers to the north. Its western part is wooded with thick beech and pine forests, while its eastern part has been a noted viticultural area since Roman times.

Geology
While Haloze has a similar climate to the rest of the Drava Valley, it is rather different geologically. Its soils are generally mid-Tertiary sandstone based on dolomite rock. Lying in the southern part of the Drava Valley, the Haloze Hills rose before the drying-out of the Pannonian Sea entered its final phase in the middle of Pleistocene epoch, about 600,000 years ago. The water ruptured its way through the modern Đerdap Gorge on the Danube River and flowed rapidly away, causing the strong erosion of poorly consolidated sandstone and thus steep hillsides.

Dialect
The Haloze dialect is one of the Pannonian dialects of spoken Slovene. See Slovene dialects.

Wine

Haloze is one of the seven districts of the Podravje wine region, with the others being Ljutomer–Ormož, Radgona–Kapela, Maribor, Prekmurje, the Central Slovene Hills, and Šmarje–Virštanj.

Viticulture in Haloze was started by the Celts as early as the 4th century BC, and spread with the arrival of the Romans. Christianity also continued the tradition as wine played an important role in their ceremonies. The Slavic tribes who later settled in Haloze took on the cultivation of vines from their predecessors.

Vineyards here mostly line the upper hillsides, as the lower slopes are often kept in excessive shade. The traditional tilling of horizontal lines of vines included the backbreaking task of carrying soil from the lowest row to the top. As the rows were tilled from the top down, the soil tended to slide downslope, and to upkeep the vineyards properly, the soil collected at the bottom had to be returned to the top. With vertically planted vineyards on less steep slopes, this work is no longer as necessary as it once was, but on most sites grass is allowed to grow between the rows to minimize erosion.

White wines dominate the area. Laski Rizling is the most frequently planted grape, which is mainly used to produce medium dry, slightly syrupy, wine. However, dry Laski Rizling is also produced. Other popular white wines include Traminec, Beli Pinot, Sauvignon, and Renski Rizling. The only red produced in significant quantities is Modri Pinot. Haložan is a blend of locally produced Laski Rizling, Sauvignon, Beli Pinot, and Sipon that ages quite well. It is often mixed with sparkling water to make spritzer.

Most of the wines grown in Haloze are produced, stored, and bottled in Ptuj in the neighbouring Central Slovene Hills area.

Monuments
Borl Castle, first mentioned in writing in 1199, is on a high rocky ledge overlooking an ancient crossing point on the Drava River. During the Second World War the castle was used by the occupying Germans as an internment camp, and after the war it was converted into a hotel, but then lay empty and abandoned. Recently the state has taken over the care of it and has undertaken its architectural restoration.

See also
 Hrvatsko Zagorje

References

External links
 Haloze–Zagorje tourist zone
 Haloze.net 

Geography of Styria (Slovenia)
Wine regions of Slovenia
Natura 2000 in Slovenia